Song of Joy is the second studio album by Captain & Tennille, released in 1976. Three out of the four singles released from the album were top-ten singles: "Muskrat Love", "Lonely Night (Angel Face)" and "Shop Around".  The title track was co-written and originally performed by their A&M Records label mate Billy Preston.

Track listing
"Song of Joy" (Billy Preston, Reginald Rasputin Boutte) - 3:14
"Lonely Night (Angel Face)" (Neil Sedaka) - 3:16
"Mind Your Love" (Jerry Reed Hubbard) - 2:59
"Smile for Me One More Time" (Toni Tennille) - 3:17
"Shop Around" (Smokey Robinson, Berry Gordy, Jr.) - 3:29
"Going Bananas" (Daryl Dragon) - 2:10
"Butterscotch Castle" (Toni Tennille, Daryl Dragon) - 3:19
"Muskrat Love" (Willis Alan Ramsey) - 3:48
"Thank You, Baby" (Bruce Johnston) - 3:38
"Wedding Song (There Is Love)" (Paul Stookey) - 3:18
"1954 Boogie Blues" (Toni Tennille, Daryl Dragon) - 4:54

Later in 1976, Pickwick Records re-issued Song of Joy. However, two tracks, "Mind Your Love" and "Butterscotch Castle", were omitted from the re-issue.

Singles
"Lonely Night" (Angel Face) A&M 1782 b/w "Smile For Me One More Time" (#3 Hot 100, #1 Adult Contemporary) 
"Shop Around"  A&M 1817 b/w "Butterscotch Castle" (#4 Hot 100, #1 Adult Contemporary)
"Muskrat Love"  A&M 1870 b/w "Honey Come Love Me" (#4 Hot 100, #1 Adult Contemporary) 
"Wedding Song (There Is Love)" A&M 8601

Personnel
Toni Tennille - piano, vocals
Daryl Dragon - guitar, bass guitar, keyboards
Buddy Childers - trumpet
Bud Shank - saxophone
Hal Blaine - drums, percussion
Frank Capp - percussion
James Getzoff - concertmaster
Jim Horn - baritone and tenor saxophones
Bobby Knight - trombone
Charles Loper - trombone
Jack Nimitz - saxophone
Tony Terran - trumpet
Michael Wimberly - trombone
Clark Burroughs, Gary Sims, Jubilant Sykes, Pat Miller, Jane Tennille, Louisa Tennille, Melissa Tennille, Andy Boettner - background vocals

Certifications

References

Song of Joy - Captain & Tennille

1976 albums
A&M Records albums
Captain & Tennille albums
Albums recorded at A&M Studios